The Best of LeAnn Rimes is a greatest hits album by American country singer LeAnn Rimes, released in 2004, it tweaks the 2003 US release Greatest Hits, leaving behind some of the purer country hits that did not translate outside of the US—notably, Al Anderson's "Big Deal"—and concentrating on her big pop crossover hits, including "How Do I Live", "Can't Fight the Moonlight" and her duet with Ronan Keating, "Last Thing on My Mind".

Track listing

Personnel
 Tim Akers – keyboards
 Tom Bukovac – electric guitar
 Lisa Cochran – background vocals
 Perry Coleman – background vocals
 Eric Darken – percussion
 Dan Dugmore – steel guitar
 Shannon Forrest – drums
 Dann Huff – electric guitar
 Elton John – duet vocals on "Written in the Stars"
 Ronan Keating – duet vocals on "Last Thing on My Mind"
 Shawn Lee – drums, percussion
 The London Session Orchestra – strings
 B. James Lowry – acoustic guitar
 Jerry McPherson – electric guitar
 Wil Malone – string arrangements, conductor
 Dominic Miller – acoustic guitar, electric guitar
 Steve Nathan – keyboards
 LeAnn Rimes – lead vocals
 Steve Robson – acoustic guitar, keyboards
 Rohan Thomas – keyboards
 Glenn Worf – bass guitar

Charts
The Best of LeAnn Rimes debuted on UK Albums Chart at No. 2, the highest debut for Rimes on the UK Chart, it spent 16 weeks in the top 30 and was certified Platinum there, the album also peaked within the top 10 in five other countries in Europe.

Weekly charts

Remixed version

Year end-chart

Sales

References

External links
Official International Website

2004 greatest hits albums
LeAnn Rimes albums
2004 remix albums
Curb Records compilation albums
Curb Records remix albums